Lejops vittatus is a European species of hoverfly.

Description

Habits

Distribution

References

Diptera of Europe
Eristalinae
Insects described in 1822
Taxa named by Johann Wilhelm Meigen